The 1996–97 North Dakota Fighting Sioux men's ice hockey team represented the University of North Dakota in college ice hockey during the 1996–97 NCAA Division I men's ice hockey season. In its 3rd year under head coach Dean Blais the team compiled a 31–10–2 record and reached the NCAA tournament for the thirteenth time. The Fighting Sioux defeated Boston University 6–4 to win the championship game at the Bradley Center in Milwaukee, Wisconsin.

Season
North Dakota entered the year with very few expectations. The team had only one winning season in the previous five years, had only two NHL draft picks on the roster and was seven years removed from their last NCAA tournament appearance. They had been improving under 3rd-year coach Dean Blais, but the team had yet to regain the prominence that the Fighting Sioux once possessed.

Fast start
While they were picked to finish 5th in the WCHA by the preseason coaches poll, the Sioux open with a six-game winning streak, albeit against fairly weak competition. Their progress was stymied when they headed to Minneapolis and lost both games to the Golden Gophers. UND split the following two weekends before finally recovering with a pair of wins over Minnesota–Duluth.

Mid-season stumble
The Fighting Sioux won most of their games around the winter break, but when they returned to their conference schedule they couldn't find any consistency. North Dakota split three consecutive weekends in January and headed into the final weekend of the month hoping they could recover their defensive game. League-leading Minnesota was hardly the ideal opponent for North Dakota but two wins over the Gophers tied the season series and set up the possibility that UND could win the WCHA title.

North Dakota went 5–1 over the next three weeks, extending their lead over Minnesota to 4 points. All the Fighting Sioux had to do in the final weekend was earn a single point against Denver and they would guarantee the regular season title for themselves. The Pioneers, however, had other ideas. North Dakota lost both games while Minnesota won both of theirs, leaving the two teams tied with identical conference records. While North Dakota had to share the conference title with the Gophers, they won the tie-breaker between the two and were awarded with the top seed in the WCHA tournament.

Conference tournament
North Dakota opened with two relatively easy home wins over Michigan Tech and advanced to the semifinal at the St. Paul Civic Center. After another comfortable win over Colorado College, North Dakota met Minnesota in the championship and the two teams fought a pitched battle for conference supremacy. The two teams fought back-and-forth all night, ending regulation knotted at 3–3. It's didn't take long to end the game once overtime began when 4th-liner Peter Armbrust fired a rebound into the net at 2:17 to win the championship.

NCAA tournament
The conference title gave North Dakota the second western seed, allowing them to bypass the first round and begin the tournament in the quarterfinal round. They promptly took out ECAC champion Cornell and advanced to the Frozen Four. In the national semifinal North Dakota swiftly built a 3–0 lead on Colorado College. The Tigers responded with two goals to get back into the game but a pair of Fighting Sioux markers 43 seconds apart ended CC's hopes and UND was heading to the championship game.

In the final it was Boston University who got the jump early, scoring twice in the first. North Dakota was able to turn the game into a track meet in the second and tie the game by the mid-way point. In the 12th minute, Peter Donatelli drew a controversial penalty, giving BU a power play, but it was UND's Matt Henderson who was able to score on the disadvantage. The Terriers tied the game on a separate power play shortly thereafter. UND regained the lead with their own extra-man goal two minutes later and added a fifth goal just before the period ended.

With a two-goal lead, North Dakota played a much more defensive-minded game in the third period. They were able to hold the Terriers off of the scoresheet until the final minute but a goal by Jon Coleman cut the lead to one with less than a minute to play. BU attempted to get control of the puck inside the Sioux end for a chance to tie the game but UND was able to clear the zone and Adam Calder sent the puck into an empty net for the final goal of North Dakota's championship season.

Awards and honors
Matt Henderson's five points in the Frozen Four earned him the Tournament MOP as well as a place on the All-Tournament team with teammates David Hoogsteen, Curtis Murphy and Aaron Schweitzer. Hoogsteen and Murphy were also named to the AHCA All-American West Second Team. Both players were joined by Jason Blake on the All-WCHA First Team while Dean Blais was awarded both the WCHA Coach of the Year and the Spencer Penrose Award as the national coach of the year.

The surprise win by North Dakota in 1997 began a nearly unbroken stretch of 20 years where the program reached the NCAA tournament. In that time they appeared in 10 Frozen Fours and won an additional two National championships.

Standings

Schedule

|-
!colspan=12 style=";" | Exhibition

|-
!colspan=12 style=";" | Regular Season

|-
!colspan=11 style=";" | 

|- align="center" bgcolor="#e0e0e0"
|colspan=11|North Dakota Won Series 2-0

|-
!colspan=11 style=";" |

Roster

Scoring statistics

Goaltending statistics

1997 national championship

(W2) North Dakota vs. (E2) Boston University

Players drafted into the NHL

1997 NHL Entry Draft

References

North Dakota Fighting Hawks men's ice hockey seasons
North Dakota
North Dakota
North Dakota
North Dakota
North Dakota
North Dakota